Cuchilla Grande is a hill range that crosses the east part of Uruguay from north to south. It extends from the south part of Cerro Largo Department, through the departments of Treinta y Tres and Lavalleja and ends in Maldonado Department where it forms its highest peaks.

Noted features

In the southern part of this range, there is the Cerro Catedral, the highest point of the country. This hill is situated in the Maldonado Department.

Also found in this range is the Cerro Pan de Azúcar, likewise situated in the Maldonado Department, near Piriápolis.

Secondary ranges
 Cuchilla de Mansavillagra
 Sierra Carapé
 Sierra Aceguá
 Sierra de las Ánimas
 Cuchilla Grande Inferior
 Cuchilla de Cerro Largo

See also
 Geography of Uruguay

External links
 Cerro Catedral, Site of the Municipality of Maldonado, Uruguay.

Hills of Uruguay